Armando Estrada (born 28 January 1930) is a Cuban basketball player. He competed in the men's tournament at the 1952 Summer Olympics.

References

1930 births
Living people
Cuban men's basketball players
Olympic basketball players of Cuba
Basketball players at the 1952 Summer Olympics
Place of birth missing (living people)